Armelle Lago (born 5 January 1986) is a French-born Ivorian former footballer who played as a forward. She has been a member of the Ivory Coast women's national team.

International career
Lago capped for Ivory Coast at senior level during the 2008 African Women's Championship qualification (second round).

See also
List of Ivory Coast women's international footballers

References

1986 births
Living people
Citizens of Ivory Coast through descent
Ivorian women's footballers
Women's association football forwards
Ivory Coast women's international footballers
People from Ivry-sur-Seine
Footballers from Val-de-Marne
French women's footballers
Paris Saint-Germain Féminine players
Black French sportspeople
French sportspeople of Ivorian descent